Kato Ajanare may refer to:
Kato Ajanare (novel), a Bengali novel written by Mani Shankar Mukherjee
Kato Ajanare (film) (1959), an unfinished film of Ritwik Ghatak